Harrison Evans Salisbury (November 14, 1908 – July 5, 1993), was an American journalist and the first regular New York Times correspondent in Moscow after World War II.

Biography
Salisbury  was born in Minneapolis, Minnesota. He graduated from Minneapolis North High School in 1925 and the University of Minnesota in 1930.

He spent nearly 20 years with United Press (UP), much of it overseas, and was UP's foreign editor during the last two years of World War II. Additionally, he was The New York Times''' Moscow bureau chief from 1949–1954. Salisbury constantly battled Soviet censorship and won the Pulitzer Prize for International Reporting in 1955.  He twice (in 1957 and 1966) received the George Polk Award for Foreign Reporting.

In the 1960s, he covered the growing civil rights movement in the Southern United States. From there, he directed The Times' coverage of President John F. Kennedy's assassination in 1963. In 1970, he served as the first editor of The Times' Op-Ed page, which was created by John B. Oakes, and was assistant managing editor from 1964–1972, associate editor from 1972–1973. He retired from The Times in 1973.

Salisbury was among the earliest mainstream journalists to oppose the Vietnam War after reporting from North Vietnam in 1966.  He took much heat from the Johnson Administration and the political Right, but his previous standards of objectivity helped him to take the lead in journalistic opinion against the war. He is interviewed in the anti-Vietnam War documentary film In the Year of the Pig. He was the first American journalist to report on the Vietnam War from North Vietnam after having been invited there by the North Vietnamese government in late 1966. His report was the first that genuinely questioned the American air war.

Salisbury also toured America for Esquire, for which the Xerox company paid him $55,000.

Salisbury reported extensively from Communist China, where, in 1989, he witnessed the bloody government crackdown on the student demonstration in Tiananmen Square.

He wrote 29 books, including American in Russia (1955) and Behind the Lines—Hanoi (1967). His other books include The Shook-Up Generation (1958), Orbit of China (1967), War Between Russia and China (1969), The 900 Days: The Siege of Leningrad (1969), To Peking and Beyond: A Report on the New Asia (1973), The Gates of Hell (1975), Black Night, White Snow: Russia's Revolutions 1905-1917 (1978), Without Fear or Favor: The New York Times and Its Times (1980), Journey For Our Times (autobiographical, 1983), China: 100 Years of Revolution, (1983), The Long March: The Untold Story (1985), Tiananmen Diary: Thirteen Days in June (1989), The New Emperors: China in the Era of Mao and Deng (1992) and his last, Heroes of My Time (1993). The 900 Days'' was in the process of being adapted into a feature film by famous Italian director Sergio Leone at the time of Leone's death in 1989.

In 1964, he married Charlotte Y. Salisbury, who accompanied him on numerous trips to Asia.  She wrote seven books about their experiences.

Salisbury was an Eagle Scout and a recipient of the Distinguished Eagle Scout Award from the Boy Scouts of America. He was a member of both the American Academy of Arts and Sciences and the American Philosophical Society. In 1990, he received the Ischia International Journalism Award.

He died in Providence, Rhode Island at age 84.

References

External links
Harrison E. Salisbury, 84, Author and Reporter, Dies
Harrison Salisbury papers at Columbia University

The NYPR Audio Archive Collections

1908 births
1993 deaths
American male journalists
20th-century American journalists
20th-century American memoirists
George Polk Award recipients
Writers from Minneapolis
Pulitzer Prize for International Reporting winners
The New York Times writers
University of Minnesota alumni
American expatriates in the Soviet Union
20th-century American male writers
North Community High School alumni
Recipients of Ischia International Journalism Award
Members of the American Philosophical Society
Members of the American Academy of Arts and Letters